Bridget McDonough is the co-founder of Light Opera Works.

References 

American musical theatre directors
American theatre managers and producers
Northwestern University alumni
Year of birth missing (living people)
Living people